Gladstone is a British cat who is the resident chief mouser to HM Treasury in Whitehall, London. He is a domestic short-haired cat, who, at eighteen months old, assumed the position of chief mouser in late June 2016. Gladstone's political namesake is former Chancellor and Prime Minister William Ewart Gladstone, who served for four separate periods, more than any other Chancellor. Gladstone is responsible for catching mice at the Treasury's 1 Horse Guards Road building.

The inception of the position of chief mouser at the Treasury followed the creation of similar positions at 10 Downing Street (Chief Mouser to the Cabinet Office) and the Foreign Office; those positions were held by Larry and Palmerston, as of July 2016. The decision to introduce an official mouser was taken by John Kingman, former acting Permanent Secretary at the Treasury. The appointment of Gladstone as "Chief Mouser to the Treasury" was officially announced on 29 July 2016.

Gladstone was taken to his new home at the Treasury in late June 2016, but the fallout from the referendum on European Union membership delayed the public announcement until late July.

Early life

Gladstone was brought in by a staff member of Battersea Dogs & Cats Home Lost and Found team in May 2016 as a neglected stray, after trying to get into his cat flap for a few weeks. He had been wandering the streets of London, hungry and without a microchip, so that his owners could not be located. At Battersea, he was known as Timmy. Like many homeless cats without daily access to food and water, he would eat too much, too quickly. A special activity puzzle feeder remedied this issue.

Career
Within 48 hours of moving in, Gladstone made his first catch. Described as "a cold-blooded killer", he went on to register six catches in his first three months in office. Food for Gladstone is taken care of by Treasury staff, who volunteer the modest sums required for his daily needs. At weekends, the Treasury's facilities and security team look after his domestic needs and personal protection. His employment is at no cost to taxpayers.

Recognition

On 28 July 2017, Gladstone celebrated his first anniversary at HM Treasury. A few days after his debut on Instagram in July 2016, he had 1,200 followers. As of January 2023, the number is over 22,500, though his Instagram has not seen a new post since February 2020. 'A cat's life – after a year in the spotlight, Gladstone sets the record straight', details his life at the Treasury. As of 28 July 2017, Gladstone's number of mice caught is 22. No update has yet been given on this number.

In popular culture
Gladstone has a social media presence on an official Instagram page, and has been reported on by media outlets as far away as Northern Ireland. A parody account @TreasuryMog, also exists on Twitter. He often receives trinkets such as cat toys, Christmas baubles from Brazil, a personalised collar, and a Halloween handmade knitted scarf from Australia. He appeared on the Treasury's official YouTube site, in 'Where's Gladstone Gone?', for 2016's Open House London, which also appeared on Sky News. In March 2017, Gladstone was featured in the London Time Out magazine's 'Pet Power List: definitive guide to the political animals of Westminster'.

See also
Chief Mouser to the Cabinet Office
Palmerston (cat), former Chief Mouser to the Foreign & Commonwealth Office
List of individual cats

External links 
 A cat's life - after a year in the spotlight, Gladstone sets the record straight
 'Where's Gladstone Gone?' 2016 Open House London Official Video
 Gladstone the Cat Becomes 'Chief Mouser' for the Treasury Video
 Gladstone's Official Instagram Page (@treasury_cat)
 HM Treasury Officially Announces Newest Staff Member
 Pet power list: Time Out's definitive guide to the political animals of Westminster

References 

|-

2014 animal births
HM Treasury
Individual cats in England
Individual cats in politics
Working cats